Jekhish (also Romanized as Jekhīsh) is a village in Gowharan Rural District, Gowharan District, Bashagard County, Hormozgan Province, Iran. At the 2006 census, its population was 15, in 5 families.

References 

Populated places in Bashagard County